A squishy is a type of soft toy made of a specially formulated soft polyurethane foam, that slowly returns to its original shape after being squeezed. Squishies are manufactured into many different shapes and sizes, such as animals, fruits, and food items.  They are often scented to match the object represented.  The toy is also called kawaii squishy, kawaii meaning "cute" in Japanese.

Originating in Japan, squishies became available in the US in the spring of 2017.  In the following years, the toys become popular all over the world,  and have huge presence on social media (especially YouTube and Instagram).

Squishies became popular among children and adolescents, but also among adults, for the tactile pleasure that one experiences squishing them — which is said to relieve stress.

History
Squishies are a recent member of a more general class of mindless manipulation toys, that includes stress balls and fidget spinners. The genre may be seen as very old, including for example the 16th century cup-and-balltoy (bilboquet).

Health issues
The Danish Environmental Protection Agency tested 12 squishies and found that they all release unacceptable levels of harmful substances, such as dimethylformamide, leading to their removal from the Danish market and the recommendation that all squishies be discarded and that they can safely be disposed as household waste.

Squishies have also been taken off the market in Norway because of their potential choking hazard and their popularity with small children between ages 6-12.

See also
 Kinetic sand
 Flubber (material)
 Slime (toy)
 Silly Putty
 Office toy
 Fidget Cube
 Baoding balls

References

Plastic toys
Novelty items
Sensory toys
Toy recalls